James Ward Porter was elected a state representative in Georgia during the Reconstruction era, representing Chatham County. Before becoming a representative he was the owner of a tailor's shop in Savannah. This was unusual, as the laws in Georgia at the time largely prohibited Black people from owning property.  He and other African Americans were expelled from the legislature.

See also
Original 33
African-American officeholders during and following the Reconstruction era

References

19th-century American politicians
African-American state legislators in Georgia (U.S. state)
African-American politicians during the Reconstruction Era
Year of birth missing
Year of death missing
Original 33
Georgia (U.S. state) Republicans